The 16th Sabah State Legislative Assembly is the current term of the Sabah State Legislative Assembly, the legislative branch of the Government of Sabah in Sabah, Malaysia. The 16th Assembly consists of 79 members that 73 members were elected in the 2020 Sabah election and 6 members were nominated by the Government and is serving from 26 October 2020 until the next state election.

Background
Gabungan Rakyat Sabah (GRS) coalition won the election with a simple majority of 38 seats. The coalition consists of Parti Gagasan Rakyat Sabah (GAGASAN) (25), Homeland Solidarity Party (STAR) (6), United Sabah Party (PBS) (7), United Sabah National Organisation (USNO) (0) and Sabah Progressive Party (SAPP) (1). Hajiji Noor from GAGASAN was sworn in as Chief Minister 3 days later.

Officeholders

Speakership 

 Speaker: Kadzim Yahya (non-MLA)
 Deputy Speaker: 
 Ahmad Abdul Rahman (non-MLA)
 George Anthony Ginibun (non-MLA)

Other parliamentary officers 

 Secretary: Rafidah Maqbol Rahman
 Deputy Secretary: Jayreh Jaya
 Serjeants-at-Arms: Mohd Sabri Metan
 Deputy Serjeants-at-Arms: Mahar Rungkim

Party leaders

Government 
 Leader of the Gabungan Rakyat Sabah (GRS) and the component party, Parti Gagasan Rakyat Sabah (GAGASAN):  Hajiji Noor (Chief Minister & Sulaman MLA)

 Leader of the Homeland Solidarity Party (STAR):  Jeffrey Kitingan (Deputy Chief Minister I & State Minister of Agriculture and Fisheries & Tambunan MLA)
 Leader of the Pakatan Harapan (PH) of Sabah:  Christina Liew Chin Jin (State Minister of Tourism, Culture and Environment & Api-Api MLA)
 Leader of the Democratic Action Party (DAP) of Sabah:  Poon Ming Fung (Chairman of Sabah Development Board & Tanjong Papat MLA) 
 Leader of the Social Democratic Harmony Party (KDM):  Peter Anthony (Melalap MLA)
 Leader of the Sabah Progressive Party (SAPP):  Yong Teck Lee (Nominated MLA)

Opposition 
 Leader of the Heritage Party (WARISAN) of Sabah:  Shafie Apdal (Leader of the Opposition & Senallang MLA)
 Leader of the Barisan Nasional (BN) of Sabah and United Malays National Organisation (UMNO) of Sabah:  Bung Moktar Radin (Lamag MLA)

Floor leaders 

 Leader of the House: 
 Shadow Leader of the House:

Whips 

 Government Whip:
 Opposition Whip:

Current composition 

On 25 February 2021, Sebatik MLA Hassan A. Gani Pg. Amir left WARISAN and joined BERSATU on 6 April 2021.

On 10 March 2021, independent Pitas MLA Ruddy Awah joined BERSATU.

On 8 October 2021, Sindumin MLA Yusof Yacob left WARISAN and officially rejoined BN and UMNO on 22 May 2022 after leaving four years ago in 2018. 

On 30 October 2021, Segama MLA Mohammadin Ketapi left WARISAN and joined BERSATU on 26 November 2021. However, he left BERSATU on 28 June 2022. He then joined PBM on 28 August 2022. 

On 28 December 2021, Limbahau MLA Juil Nuatim and Melalap MLA Peter Anthony left WARISAN and founded a new local political party based in Sabah namely Social Democratic Harmony Party (KDM) that is aligned with the ruling GRS coalition on 28 January 2022.

On 20 January 2022, Elopura MLA Calvin Chong and Sri Tanjong MLA Justin Wong left DAP but carried on aligning themselves with the PH opposition coalition and officially joined WARISAN on 26 March 2022.

On 5 June 2022, Kukusan MLA Rina Jainal left WARISAN and joined PHRS on the same day.

On 21 October 2022, State Assistant Minister to the Chief Minister and Bandau MLA Wetrom Bahanda left BERSATU and joined KDM on the same day.

On 10 December 2022, The leadership of Bersatu Sabah announced its exit from the party and will form a new local party. Bersatu Sabah Chairman Hajiji Noor said the “unanimous decision” by Bersatu Sabah leaders to leave the party is based on the premise that the status quo is “no longer tenable”.

On 6 February 2023, Mohammad Mohamarin, Ben Chong Chen Bin and Norazlinah Arif left WARISAN on the same day and support the ruling GRS coalition.

On 21 February 2023, Yusof Yacob, along with other 8 MLAs support Hajiji. At the same time, Yusof Yacob, James Ratib, Jasnih Daya, Arshad Bistari, Hamid Awang, Mohammad Mohamarin, Ben Chong and Norazlinah joined GAGASAN.

On 27 February 2023, Awang Ahmad Sah Awang Shaari left WARISAN for GAGASAN.

On 4 March 2023, Karamunting MLA George Hiew Vun Zin left WARISAN for GAGASAN.

Seating plan

References

Sabah State Legislative Assembly